Producers' Showcase is an American anthology television series that was telecast live during the 1950s in compatible color by NBC. With top talent, the 90-minute episodes, covering a wide variety of genres, aired under the title every fourth Monday at 8 pm ET for three seasons, beginning October 18, 1954. The final episode, the last of 37, was broadcast May 27, 1957.

Showcase Productions, Inc., packaged and produced the series, which received seven Emmy Awards, including the 1956 award for Best Dramatic Series.

Production
In 1953, stage producer Leland Hayward had the idea to create a 90-minute TV series, a series of color spectaculars to be broadcast monthly on NBC. Hayward was represented by Saul Jaffe of the Madison Avenue law firm Jaffe & Jaffe; Henry Jaffe, the firm's senior partner, was national counsel for the American Federation of Television and Radio Artists, an organization he helped found. When illness forced Hayward to withdraw from the project, NBC partnered with Showcase Productions, an independent production company created by Henry and Saul Jaffe to produce the series. Producers' Showcase went on the air October 18, 1954.

The ambitious series presented a total of 37 live color programs, which included original musicals or plays, restaging of Broadway productions, great concert artists, and tribute programs. Producers' Showcase presented the first international show with live remote locations (Wide Wide World), and the first full-length Broadway production on color television (Peter Pan).

"Producers' Showcase has undoubtedly been a tremendous prestige presentation by the network with elaborate and worthy cultural productions," The New York Times published in 1957, the series' final year.

Producers' Showcase received seven Emmy Awards, including the 1956 award for Best Dramatic Series.

Premiere episode
Director Otto Preminger was invited to produce and direct Tonight at 8.30, a trio of one-act plays by Noël Coward, for the series premiere. Red Peppers, Still Life, and Shadow Play were three of 10 plays comprising a cycle the playwright had written to be performed on stage over the course of three evenings, and under this umbrella title they were presented on Producers' Showcase. The cast included Ginger Rogers, Trevor Howard, Gig Young, Ilka Chase, and Gloria Vanderbilt. Preminger had no experience in television, but he welcomed the opportunity to work in the medium.

From the beginning, the director obviously was in trouble. He believed a television production was no different from a film and lit the sets and placed the cameras accordingly. He failed to understand that during the actual live broadcast, he would be working with a monitor, pushing buttons to signal which camera should be operating. Rogers in particular was nervous about her performance, and Preminger spent a considerable amount of time with her, but basically ignored the rest of the cast. Supporting player Larkin Ford later recalled he felt Preminger had no sense of Coward's work or how it should be played.

As the production entered its third week of rehearsals, a complete run-through still had not been accomplished. Three days prior to the broadcast, executive producer Fred Coe decided to take action. He privately fired Preminger and then simply told the cast and crew, "Mr. Preminger will not be with us. I will be with you through the presentation." Although they felt sorry a man of Preminger's stature had been dismissed for incompetence, they were relieved he was gone. When the show aired, Preminger introduced each act in a filmed segment, and he received sole credit as producer and director. It proved to be his first and last television venture.

Peter Pan
One of the most memorable productions of the first season was telecast on March 7, 1955. Peter Pan, a recreation of the 1954 Broadway musical with all its original cast members, including Mary Martin as Peter Pan and Cyril Ritchard as Captain Hook, was so highly acclaimed by critics and well received by viewers, drawing the largest ratings for a single television program up to that time, that the program was restaged live with nearly the same cast in January 1956. A 1960 NBC revival of the production, first broadcast as a Christmas season special, was videotaped in color and later released on home video. By the time the 1960 version was made, the children had outgrown their roles and had to be replaced, but nearly all of the adult cast remained the same as those of the two earlier productions.

This production also marked the first time that any version of Peter Pan had been performed on television.

Notable appearances

 Humphrey Bogart and Lauren Bacall made their television debuts in a production of The Petrified Forest that also starred Henry Fonda, Jack Warden, and Jack Klugman. Bogart reprised the role of Duke Mantee, which he performed in the original 1935 Broadway production and the 1936 film. Fonda portrayed Leslie Howard's original role and Bacall played the Bette Davis part.
 Director William Wyler made his television debut with The Letter, starring Siobhán McKenna, John Mills, Michael Rennie, and Anna May Wong. Wyler also directed the 1940 feature film.
 Director Anatole Litvak made his television debut with Mayerling, starring Audrey Hepburn and Mel Ferrer. Litvak also directed the 1936 feature film.
 A musical adaptation of Thornton Wilder's Our Town starring Frank Sinatra, Eva Marie Saint and Paul Newman (a last-minute replacement for James Dean). Sinatra, who plays a warbling version of the stage manager and clocks the most screen time,  scored a major chart hit with the original song "Love and Marriage," which received an Emmy Award. The songs were written by Jimmy van Heusen and Sammy Cahn in the first of their many collaborations.
 In her television debut, although she was now too old for the role, Katharine Cornell recreated her original stage role as Elizabeth Barrett Browning in The Barretts of Wimpole Street, with Anthony Quayle as Robert Browning.
 Husband and wife Hume Cronyn and Jessica Tandy reprised the roles they had played in the Broadway production of The Fourposter.
 Ruth Hussey, Paulette Goddard, and Mary Boland were cast in the acerbic comedy The Women.  Hussey and Goddard played different characters in the 1939 MGM film; Boland reprised her role as the Countess deLave.

Additional productions
 The ballets The Sleeping Beauty (by Tchaikovsky) and Cinderella (by Prokofiev), both with Margot Fonteyn and Michael Somes marked the first time these two ballets had ever been broadcast on television. 
 A staging of Sidney Howard's 1934 adaptation of the 1929 Sinclair Lewis novel Dodsworth, starring Fredric March, Claire Trevor and Geraldine Fitzgerald
 The Skin of Our Teeth with Helen Hayes and Mary Martin 
 Cyrano de Bergerac, with José Ferrer (recreating his award-winning stage and film role), Claire Bloom, and Christopher Plummer (a future Cyrano himself)
The Great Sebastians, directed by Franklin J. Schaffner with Lynn Fontanne, Alfred Lunt and Alan Furlan, was set in 1948 in Communist-controlled Prague, Czechoslovakia. A mind-reading act is commanded by the authorities to entertain at a private party. They discover what the authorities really want is for them to use their "powers" to expose spies and traitors to the regime. Realizing the kind of trouble they are in for, they decide to escape using their best stage tricks.
 Shakespeare's Romeo and Juliet, with Claire Bloom, John Neville, and Paul Rogers
 Festival of Music, two 90-minute programs, were devoted to classical music, featuring such performers as Jan Peerce, Arthur Rubinstein, Roberta Peters, Andrés Segovia, Jussi Björling, tenor Thomas Hayward, Boris Christoff, Isaac Stern, Leonard Warren, Zinka Milanov, Risë Stevens, and Renata Tebaldi. Most of these classical artists (except for Roberta Peters, who had appeared on George Jessel's show, and Leonard Warren, who had sung Iago in the historic 1948 first complete telecast of Verdi's Otello) were appearing on commercial American network television for the first time. The programs were hosted respectively by Charles Laughton and José Ferrer.
 The final episode, "Festival of Magic", featured Ernie Kovacs playing host to magicians from the United States, England, South Africa, Ireland, India, France, and China.

Wide Wide World
Producers' Showcase served as the springboard for the live documentary series Wide Wide World. Conceived by network head Pat Weaver and hosted by Dave Garroway, the show was introduced on Showcase on June 27, 1955. The premiere episode, featuring entertainment from the United States, Canada, and Mexico, was the first international North American telecast in the history of the medium. It received a regular Sunday afternoon time slot the following October.

Episodes
These 37 episodes comprise the Producers' Showcase library:

Reception
Producers' Showcase averaged a 36.5 percent audience share. Sixty-five million viewers watched the first presentation of Peter Pan, garnering a 68.3 audience share that made it the highest-rated episode in the series. The restaged Peter Pan earned a 54.9 share; and The Petrified Forest earned a 50.6 share. The series had this level of success even though its last third aired  opposite I Love Lucy, the highest or second-highest rated series on television during the three seasons Producers' Showcase was broadcast.

Awards
Presenters' Showcase received the following awards and nominations from the Academy of Television Arts & Sciences.

Home media
Video Artists International  has formed joint ventures with Showcase Productions, Inc. for the release of a number of Producers' Showcase programs, as well as Showcase programs from other "Golden Age of Television" series, complete with their commercial announcements, on DVD: Festival of Music (#4244), Festival of Music II (#4245), The Sleeping Beauty (#4295) and Cinderella (#4296). Although these episodes were broadcast live and in color, the kinescope process by which they were preserved is black-and-white.

References

External links

 Producers' Showcase, "The Petrified Forest" at the Internet Archive
Showcase Productions, Inc.
Producers' Showcase at CVTA
  (Kirk Browning, Charles Dubin, Jack Klugman, Delbert Mann, Tad Mosel, Arthur Penn and Ellen M. Violett)

1954 American television series debuts
1957 American television series endings
1950s American anthology television series
1950s American drama television series
English-language television shows
NBC original programming
Primetime Emmy Award for Outstanding Drama Series winners
American live television series